The social vole (Microtus socialis) is a species of rodent in the family Cricetidae. It is found in China, Iran, Kazakhstan, Syria, Turkey, and Ukraine.

References

 Baillie, J. 1996.  Microtus socialis.   2006 IUCN Red List of Threatened Species.   Downloaded on 19 July 2007.
Musser, G. G. and M. D. Carleton. 2005. Superfamily Muroidea. pp. 894–1531 in Mammal Species of the World a Taxonomic and Geographic Reference. D. E. Wilson and D. M. Reeder eds. Johns Hopkins University Press, Baltimore.

Microtus
Mammals of Azerbaijan
Vole, Social
Mammals described in 1773
Taxonomy articles created by Polbot